Kinston may refer to:
Kinston, Alabama
Kinston, North Carolina (Kingston until 1784)

See also
Kingstone, Somerset
Kingston (disambiguation)
Kingston Bridge (disambiguation)
Kington (disambiguation)
Kingstown (disambiguation)